The 1979 African Women's Handball Championship was the third edition of the African Women's Handball Championship, held in Congo from 20 to 31 July 1979. It acted as the African qualifying tournament for the 1980 Summer Olympics qualifying tournament.

Knockout stage

Bracket

Semifinals

Third place game

Final

Final ranking

External links
Results on todor66.com

1979 Women
African Women's Handball Championship
African Women's Handball Championship
International sports competitions hosted by the Republic of the Congo
African Women's Handball Championship
Women's handball in the Republic of the Congo
African Women's Handball Championship
1979 in African women's sport